Duets is a singing competition reality television show that premiered on May 24, 2012 on ABC. The show starred Kelly Clarkson, John Legend, Robin Thicke, and Jennifer Nettles as mentors who search for singers to duet with them as they perform in front of a live studio audience. Quddus serves as the host. The show is a production of Keep Calm and Carry On Productions. Robert Deaton and Charles Wachter are the executive producers.

On April 30, 2012, it was confirmed that John Legend had replaced Lionel Richie as a mentor on the show; Richie left the show citing "personal scheduling conflicts."

Premise
Clarkson, Thicke, Legend, and Nettles travel across America to find two singers each who serve as their duet partners for the show. Each week, the mentor and one of their two duet partners perform live in front of a studio audience. The contestants then receive feedback from the other stars—and graded anonymously—on their performances. At the end of the night the eight contestants are ranked on a chart. The two contestants at the bottom of the chart face-off. The loser is eliminated. After six weeks, the show goes live and the audience begins to vote on the outcome of each episode.

At the end of the competition, the winning singer wins a recording contract with Hollywood Records.

"The simple fact that I get to go out and find two people I believe in, sing with them every week and help them accomplish their dream is an amazing thing I can't wait to be a part of," stated Clarkson in a press release statement from ABC.

Artists

 The artist was partnered with Jennifer Nettles
 The artist was partnered with Robin Thicke
 The artist was partnered with Kelly Clarkson
 The artist was partnered with John Legend

1Johnny Gray was one of the two partners for John Legend on the initial broadcast. He did not return for the second show and was replaced by Meleana Brown. The show's host said this was "due to unforeseen circumstances". Gray did not give a reason on Twitter but had several tweets that said he did not 'drop out'.

Overview

Episode 1 
Theme: Superstars' Greatest Hits
Air date: May 24, 2012
Special performance: Kelly Clarkson, John Legend, Jennifer Nettles, and Robin Thicke – "Let Me Entertain You"

Episode 2 
Theme: Classic Duets
Air date: May 31, 2012
Special performance: Kelly Clarkson and Robin Thicke – "State of Shock"

Episode 3 
Theme: Songs That Inspire
Air date: June 7, 2012
Special performance: Jennifer Nettles and John Legend – I've Got The Music In Me"

Bottom Two

Episode 4 
Theme: Party Songs
Air date: June 13, 2012

Bottom 2

Episode 5 
Theme: Movie Night
Air date: June 20, 2012

Bottom 2

Episode 6 
Theme: Songs from the 2000s 
Air date: June 28, 2012
Special performance: Kelly Clarkson, John Legend, Jennifer Nettles & Robin Thicke – "Freedom! '90"
Note: First live show of the season.

Episode 7 
Theme: Favorite Standards 
Air date: July 5, 2012
Special performances: Jennifer Nettles, Robin Thicke – "Crazy Little Thing Called Love"; Kelly Clarkson, John Legend – "You Don't Know Me"

Episode 8 
Theme: Superstars Choice
Air date: July 12, 2012
Special Performance: Kelly Clarkson, Jennifer Nettles, John Legend and Robin Thicke – "Get Ready"

Episode 9 
Finale: 
Air date: July 19, 2012
Special Performances: Kelly Clarkson and Jennifer Nettles – "Would I Lie To You?", John Legend and Bridget Carrington – "Gimme Shelter", Robin Thicke and Olivia Chisholm – "Fever", J Rome – "Signed, Sealed & Delivered"

Elimination chart 

 The artist was first on the leaderboard.
 The artist was in the bottom two on the leaderboard.
 The artist was in the bottom two from viewer voting.
 The artist was eliminated.
 The artist left/removed from the competition.

Broadcast history
Duets premiered on May 24, 2012 on American Broadcasting Company with a two-hour episode. The series continued to air on Thursdays at 8:00 p.m. until June 7. Due to the NBA Finals, The show was scheduled to move to Wednesdays at 9:30 p.m. for two 90-minute installments starting June 13. The show returned to its original time slot on Thursday, June 28 with one-hour episodes until July 19.

It was announced in June 2012 that ABC canceled the series.

International broadcasts

International versions

U.S. Nielsen ratings

References

External links

2010s American music television series
2012 American television series debuts
2012 American television series endings
American Broadcasting Company original programming
Singing talent shows
English-language television shows
Music competitions in the United States
Television series by Disney–ABC Domestic Television